The 2013 WTA Awards are a series of awards given by the Women's Tennis Association to players who have achieved something remarkable during the 2013 WTA Tour.

The awards
These awards are decided by either the media, the players, the association, or the fans. Nominees were announced by the WTA's Twitter account.

Note: award winners in bold

Player of the Year
 Serena Williams

Doubles Team of the Year
 Sara Errani &  Roberta Vinci
 Su-Wei Hsieh &  Peng Shuai
 Ashleigh Barty &  Casey Dellacqua

Most Improved Player of the Year
 Simona Halep
 Sloane Stephens
 Carla Suárez Navarro

Newcomer of the Year
 Eugenie Bouchard
 Monica Puig
 Madison Keys

Comeback Player of the Year
 Alisa Kleybanova
 Andrea Petkovic
 Flavia Pennetta

Diamond Aces
 Victoria Azarenka

Fan Favourite Singles Player
 Agnieszka Radwańska
 Li Na
 Serena Williams
 Maria Sharapova
 Victoria Azarenka

Fan Favourite Doubles Team
 Ekaterina Makarova &  Elena Vesnina
 Su-Wei Hsieh &  Peng Shuai
 Ashleigh Barty &  Casey Dellacqua
 Sara Errani &  Roberta Vinci

Fan Favourite Player on Twitter
 Maria Sharapova
 Serena Williams
 Victoria Azarenka
 Caroline Wozniacki

Fan Favourite Player on Facebook
 Maria Sharapova
 Petra Kvitová
 Ana Ivanovic
 Victoria Azarenka

Fan Favourite WTA Video of the Year
 WTA 40 LOVE Story presented by Xerox | Episode 10: 2013 – 40th Anniversary of the WTA()
 Pre-Wimbledon Party
 Dubai Duty Free Travel Show | Caroline Wozniacki
 2013 TEB BNP Paribas WTA Championships – Istanbul Draw Ceremony

Fan Favourite WTA Live Show of the Year
 Western & Southern Open()
 WTA 40 LOVE Event
 Pre-Wimbledon Party
 Sony Open Tennis
 Southern California Open

WTA Shot of the Year
 Agnieszka Radwańska (quarterfinals of 2013 Sony Open Tennis against  Kirsten Flipkens)()
 Victoria Azarenka (final of 2013 Western & Southern Open against  Serena Williams)
 Maria Sharapova (final of 2013 Sony Open Tennis against  Serena Williams)
 Caroline Wozniacki (first round of 2013 Qatar Total Open against  Mervana Jugić-Salkić)
 Serena Williams (round robin at 2013 WTA Tour Championships against  Angelique Kerber)

WTA Match of the Year
 Maria Sharapova vs  Victoria Azarenka (semifinals of 2013 French Open)()
 Serena Williams vs  Petra Kvitová (quarterfinals of 2013 Qatar Total Open)
 Victoria Azarenka vs  Li Na (final of 2013 Australian Open)
 Sabine Lisicki vs  Serena Williams (Fourth round of 2013 Wimbledon Championships)
 Serena Williams vs  Maria Sharapova (final of 2013 French Open)

References

Wta Awards
WTA Awards